Playing It Wild is a 1923 American silent Western film directed by William Duncan and starring Duncan, Edith Johnson and Francis Powers.

Cast
 William Duncan as Jerry Hoskins 
 Edith Johnson as Beth Webb 
 Francis Powers as Old Man Webb 
 Dick La Reno as Sheriff Gideon 
 Edmund Cobb as Christ Gideon, His Son 
 Frank Beal as Wetherby, a Painter 
 Frank Wood as Bill Rucker

References

Bibliography
 Buck Rainey. Sweethearts of the sage: biographies and filmographies of 258 actresses appearing in western movies. McFarland & Company Incorporated Pub, 1992.

External links
 

1923 films
1923 Western (genre) films
Vitagraph Studios films
Films directed by William Duncan
American black-and-white films
Silent American Western (genre) films
1920s English-language films
1920s American films